Bliss Corner is a census-designated place (CDP) in the town of Dartmouth in Bristol County, Massachusetts, United States.  The population was 5,280 at the 2010 census.

Geography
Bliss Corner is located at  (41.606464, -70.941827).

According to the United States Census Bureau, the CDP has a total area of 5.2 km2 (2.0 mi2), all land.

Demographics

As of the census of 2000, there were 5,466 people, 2,309 households, and 1,477 families residing in the CDP. The population density was 1,050.0/km2 (2,724.3/mi2). There were 2,410 housing units at an average density of 462.9/km2 (1,201.1/mi2). The racial makeup of the CDP was 94.88% White, 0.70% African American, 0.15% Native American, 0.99% Asian, 1.02% from other races, and 2.27% from two or more races. Hispanic or Latino of any race were 0.93% of the population.

There were 2,309 households, out of which 22.6% had children under the age of 18 living with them, 51.0% were married couples living together, 9.4% had a female householder with no husband present, and 36.0% were non-families. 32.6% of all households were made up of individuals, and 23.1% had someone living alone who was 65 years of age or older. The average household size was 2.32 and the average family size was 2.95.

In the CDP, the population was spread out, with 18.1% under the age of 18, 6.5% from 18 to 24, 23.8% from 25 to 44, 23.5% from 45 to 64, and 28.1% who were 65 years of age or older. The median age was 46 years. For every 100 females, there were 85.6 males. For every 100 females age 18 and over, there were 81.3 males.

The median income for a household in the CDP was $36,610, and the median income for a family was $48,125. Males had a median income of $36,026 versus $26,726 for females. The per capita income for the CDP was $22,109. About 2.8% of families and 6.7% of the population were below the poverty line, including 3.4% of those under age 18 and 17.0% of those age 65 or over.

References

Census-designated places in Bristol County, Massachusetts
Census-designated places in Massachusetts
Dartmouth, Massachusetts
Providence metropolitan area